The Bishop of Reading is an episcopal title used by a suffragan bishop of the Church of England Diocese of Oxford, which is within the Province of Canterbury, England. The current bishop of Reading is Olivia Graham (formerly Archdeacon of Berkshire) and consecrated on 19 November 2019; Graham succeeds Andrew Proud, who retired earlier in 2019.

The title takes its name after the town of Reading in Berkshire. The bishops suffragan of Reading have been area bishops since the Oxford area scheme was founded in 1984. The Bishop of Reading is responsible for the archdeaconry of Berkshire.

List of bishops

References

External links
 Crockford's Clerical Directory - Listings

 
Bishops
Religion in Reading, Berkshire
Anglican suffragan bishops in the Diocese of Oxford